The Denver Fire Department provides fire protection and first responder emergency medical services to the city of Denver, Colorado. The Denver Fire Department also provides fire protection to the citizens of Glendale, Sheridan, Skyline and Englewood.

General Rank structure

History
The Denver Fire Department got its start on March 25, 1866 when a volunteer fire department was organized. Known as Volunteer Hook and Ladder Co. #1, the company was the first in the Colorado Territory.

Stations and apparatus 
, the Denver Fire Department operates out of 39 fire stations (including 5 Airport Stations), located throughout the city in 7 Districts, each under the command of a District Chief.

Notable Incidents

United Airlines Flight 859

In July 1961, United Airlines Flight 859 crashed during landing at the now defunct Stapleton International Airport. The aircraft, a Douglas DC-8 airliner, slammed into several airport vehicles, including construction equipment, and caught fire, killing 18 (including one on the ground) and injuring 84 from a total of 122 people on board. This incident sparked the need for the DFD to place foam engines at the airport.

Continental Airlines Flight 1713

On November 15, 1987, a Douglas DC-9-14 Continental Airlines Flight 1713 crashed while taking off in a snowstorm from Stapleton International Airport. Twenty-five passengers and three crew members died in the crash.

Continental Airlines Flight 1404

On December 20, 2008, Continental Airlines Flight 1404 from Denver International Airport to George Bush Intercontinental Airport crashed while taking off from Denver resulting in 2 critical injuries, 36 non-critical injuries and a hull loss of the Boeing 737-524 aircraft.

References

External links
Denver Firefighters Museum

Government of Denver
Fire departments in Colorado
1866 establishments in Colorado Territory